The Treaty of Schwedt was concluded on 6 October 1713, during the Great Northern War, between the Tsardom of Russia and Brandenburg-Prussia in Schwedt. Brandenburg-Prussia was promised southern Swedish Pomerania up to the Peene river, which had just been conquered by Russia. In turn, Brandenburg-Prussia accepted Russia's annexation of Swedish Ingria, Estonia and Karelia, and agreed to pay 400,000 thalers to Russia. Southern Swedish Pomerania was to be administered by Brandenburg-Prussia until a definite ruling in a peace treaty was reached.

References

External links
Scan of the treaty at IEG Mainz

Schwedt
1713 treaties
1713 in Europe
Schwedt
18th century in the Russian Empire
Schwedt
Schwedt
1713 in Prussia
Bilateral treaties of Russia